Jorge Jair Yglesias Cárdenas (born February 10, 1981 in Callao) is a Peruvian footballer. He plays as a left back for Peruvian Segunda División club Juan Aurich. He also played for Alianza Lima.

Honours

Club 
 Cienciano del Cuzco:
 Torneo Apertura: 2005

 Alianza Lima:
 Torneo Apertura: 2006
Peruvian First Division: 2006

References

External links

1981 births
Living people
Sportspeople from Callao
Association football fullbacks
Peruvian footballers
Sport Boys footballers
Sport Coopsol Trujillo footballers
Coronel Bolognesi footballers
Cienciano footballers
Club Alianza Lima footballers
José Gálvez FBC footballers
Club Deportivo Universidad César Vallejo footballers
Universidad Técnica de Cajamarca footballers
Unión Comercio footballers